Saint Joseph or St. Joseph may refer to the following unincorporated places in the U.S. state of Ohio:
Saint Joseph, Mercer County, Ohio
Saint Joseph, Portage County, Ohio

See also
Saint Joseph (disambiguation)